On March 15, 1901, an African American woman named Ballie Crutchfield was lynched by a white mob in Rome, Tennessee. The mob had tried to murder her brother, earlier that night, but was unsuccessful and took vengeance on his sister, whom they bound, shot, and threw in a creek.

Background and events
The week before the murder, rumors spread that a wallet containing $120, which a white man in Rome had lost, had been found by a Black child who had given it to a Black man, William Crutchfield. Being accused of theft, Crutchfield was quickly arrested and thrown in jail. A white mob sprang him from jail but he escaped as they tried to lynch him. When they couldn't find him, the mob took vengeance on Crutchfield's sister. She was taken out of town, and with her hands tied behind her back she was shot and thrown into a creek.

Her body was removed from the creek the next morning. Nobody was prosecuted for the murder; the New York Tribune wrote on March 16, 1901, "The Coroner's jury found the usual verdict that the woman came to her death at the hands of parties unknown."

Legacy
The Catholic Sacred Heart Review reported and commented on the lynching on March 23, 1901, in a brief but scathing report:It is a very dull week indeed that does not now bring in the news that a negro has been lynched in some corner of our great, freedom-loving country, where all men are created free and equal, and where education and enlightenment is so far advanced that there is never the least difference made in dealing out justice to white man or negro. The excuse offered by those addicted to the lynching habit is that it is the only form of justice that is swift, sure and appropriate punishment for the crimes against white women which negroes are said to be most prone to commit. But sometimes lynching is visited upon negroes who are accused of other crimes. For instance, last week a negro woman named Ballie Crutchfield was shot to death near Rome, Term., by a mob, on suspicion that she was concerned in the theft of a pocketbook containing $120, lost by Walter Sampson a week ago. The pocketbook had been found by a brother of the woman. He was arrested, but escaped from the lynching mob, who became enraged and killed the woman instead.

Crutchfield's murder is one of the many lynchings remembered at the National Memorial for Peace and Justice in Montgomery, Alabama.

References

External links

1901 in Tennessee
1901 murders in the United States
People murdered in Tennessee
Lynching deaths in Tennessee
Racially motivated violence against African Americans
Murdered African-American people
Race-related controversies in the United States
Smith County, Tennessee
African-American history of Tennessee